was a Japanese actress.

Biography
Haruko Kato was born in Akasaka, Minato, Tokyo, on 24 November 1922.

She married the playwright  in 1946, but he died in 1953. She married actor  in 1958, but they divorced in 1973.

Kato died on 2 November 2015 at her home in Tokyo, aged 92.

Filmography

Films
 Higashi Shinakai (1968)
 Something Like It (1981), Yumi's mother
 Gray Sunset (1985), Kikuyo Takano
 Capone Cries a Lot (1985)
 Gonza the Spearman (1986)
 Tokyo Blackout (1987)
 Kiki's Delivery Service (1989), Madame (voice)
 Pistol Opera (2001)
 Blooming Again (2004)
 Howl's Moving Castle (2004), Madame Suliman (voice)
 Chameleon (2008)
 Still Walking (2008)
 About Her Brother (2010)

Television
 Ashura no Gotoku (TV series) (1979,1980)
 Ōoku (1983)
 Furuhata Ninzaburō (1996)

Awards
In 2002, Kato was awarded the Order of the Precious Crown.

References

External links
 
 Haruko Kato at Allcinema Movie & DVD Database 
 Haruko Kato filmography at Moview Walker database 

Actresses from Tokyo
1922 births
2015 deaths